Choristenes is a genus of moths belonging to the subfamily Tortricinae of the family Tortricidae.

Species
Choristenes melitoptila (Meyrick, 1938)

See also
List of Tortricidae genera

References

External links
tortricidae.com

Tortricidae genera